That's Life! was a satirical TV consumer affairs programme on the BBC, at its height regularly reaching audiences of fifteen to twenty million, and receiving 10–15,000 letters a week.
 
The series was broadcast on BBC1 for 21 years, from 26 May 1973 until 19 June 1994.

Format
That's Life was a magazine which mixed serious and light-hearted items combined with satire in a studio-based format with film inserts, devised by Peter Chafer, John Lloyd and Esther Rantzen, it was presented and produced by Esther Rantzen with various teams of reporters and contributors. Special spin-off programmes concentrated on serious topics which were first aired on That's Life, such as childbirth, mental health and child abuse.  Its journalism relied on the skills of researchers many of whom went on to hold very senior jobs both inside and outside the media industry. The large audiences, regularly topping the ratings charts and reaching a maximum of 22.5 million viewers, resulted in several changes in laws and practice, such as the introduction of compulsory seat belts for children, support for transplantation and the installing of safe surfaces in children's playgrounds.

Origins
Bernard Braden, the Canadian actor and broadcaster, invented consumer programmes for British television with his ITV show "On the Braden Beat."   When in 1968 Braden and his wife Barbara Kelly agreed to transfer to the BBC, he starred with her in a situation comedy for the Entertainment Department, and he presented a consumer show which was produced in Desmond Wilcox's Features Department. John Lloyd was a freelance producer who had worked with Braden on the ITV consumer show, and in 1968 was hired to produce Braden's Week for the BBC. That show ran from 1968 to 1972 on Saturday nights on BBC1, featuring Esther Rantzen and John Pitman as reporters, and Ronald Fletcher, Chris Munds and Hilary Pritchard as humorous punctuation.  It also memorably featured Frankie Howerd, Victor Ross of Reader's Digest, and an expose of Robert Maxwell's company Pergamon Press. The format which was extremely popular included a studio audience, a regular music slot featuring singer/songwriter Jake Thackray, and sketches performed by Munds and Pritchard.
It is sometimes wrongly thought that Braden was sacked by the BBC for making a commercial for Stork margarine in the summer of 1971, and although advertising a product was not felt compatible with Braden's role in a consumer show, in fact Desmond Wilcox interceded for him with BBC senior executives, pointing out that at the time he was not under contract to the BBC, and he returned to make another series that autumn. (")
However, in 1972 Braden was hired by a Canadian network to create a similar programme there. After he left, producers Peter Chafer, John Lloyd and presenter Esther Rantzen were tasked by the BBC to create a replacement consumer programme without Braden.  Rantzen invented the title, That's Life! When Bernard Braden returned to the UK having completed his contract to make a consumer programme in Canada, his show Braden's Week had been replaced in his absence, and Esther Rantzen was fronting That's Life! Braden's wife Barbara Kelly never forgave Rantzen and was convinced that she had stolen the role from Braden and only got the job because she was in a relationship with (and later married to)  Features Department head Desmond Wilcox.

Launch of That's Life! 
The first series of That's Life! broadcast in the summer of 1973 was written by John Lloyd, executive-produced by Peter Chafer and was presented by Bob Wellings (co-presenter of the nightly current affairs magazine programme Nationwide), George Layton, (actor, director and screenwriter) and Esther Rantzen. A regular feature was "Heap of the Week" filmed by Bill Nicholson, later a novelist and Oscar-nominated screenwriter. At the end of the run the Controller of BBC1 decided that the show had potential, but not with that presentation team, since only Rantzen was comfortable in the consumer role.
A second series was commissioned for which Rantzen was promoted to producer/presenter, a role she held for the next twenty years. Kieran Prendiville, a journalist who had worked on Man Alive, and actor Glyn Worsnip, both joined the team as reporters and stayed for five years.

Production team 
Throughout the 21 years, research and investigative journalism were the backbone of the programme, since most material was based on the first-hand experience of viewers which had to be rigorously investigated. All the reporters were also involved in researching items, as part of a team many of whom went on to senior roles in broadcasting and elsewhere. Alumni of the That's Life! production team include, among many others:
BAFTA winning film-maker Adam Curtis 
Helen Tumbridge executive producer of The Chase and Beat the Chasers 
Elaine Hackett creator of Crackit Productions
Liz Mills CEO of Captive Minds
Bob Duffield executive chair of GreyList
The Rt Hon Shaun Woodward ex Secretary of State for Northern Ireland and Chair of LAMDA
Sir Peter Bazalgette, (chair of ITV, president of the Royal Television Society, chair of the Arts Council) who in interview (blog "How Did They Do It?)  stated "I specialised in programmes like That's Life, which was a bit like a local newspaper on national television and it had funny items and human interest stories but it also had some quite hard consumer stories as well and it was a way of making factual information entertaining. It was a very, very formative experience working with Esther Rantzen on that programme because it gave me an interest in how can we make information entertaining.",
Richard Woolfe, BAFTA winning channel controller at Channel Five and Sky, and independent producer/Head of Department Living TV and Planet 24 
Bryher Scudamore, editor of That's Life! editor in chief of BBC Online, channel editor of UK Horizons, creator of Autodotbiography 
Sebastian Scott,  co-founder and joint managing director of Princess Productions, consultant, News Corp
Donna Taberer head of Public Service Partnerships, BBC Academy
Patsy Newey, BAFTA nominated executive producer
Angela Wallis, executive producer BBC and independent
Patricia Houlihan, series producer Holiday
Ian Sharp, film director Robin of Sherwood, second unit Bond films 
Shaun Ley, journalist and news presenter
Jane Elsdon Dew, producer, director and trainer, BBC Academy
Owen Gay, producer, director and commissioning editor
Robin Bextor, film director and author
Tim Knatchbull, author and film director
Pam Wagman, film producer
Chris Choi, consumer editor for ITV News
Alice Beer, consumer journalist and expert Watchdog and This Morning
Charlie Bunce, author, head of Factual Programmes, executive producer Grand Designs
Steve Havers, founder of Spark Media and creator of Escape to the Chateau
James Hawes, drama and factual film director
Yvette Austin, BBC environment correspondent
Laurence Rees, historian, ex-head of BBCtv History programmes and author, expert on Nazi history

That's Life! investigations

Swindles 
During the 21 years many investigations highlighted dangers, swindles and injustices.  Among the conmen were Peter Foster who was first exposed for selling a fake "slimming" tea called Bai Lin, various door-to-door salesmen selling double glazing, Coach House Finance based in Colchester in March/April/1975 which resulted in a conviction for fraud, and many fake slimming aids.

Safety items 
Including stories publicizing dangerous cots, lifts, taxi doors, the introduction of safe playground surfaces, and inspiring the legal requirement for seat belts for children in cars.

Child abuse 
This was regularly exposed on the programme. The launch of Childline by Esther Rantzen was inspired by a helpline for abused children set up after one episode of the programme.

Significant campaigns

Ben Hardwick 

Ben Hardwick was a two-year-old toddler dying of biliary atresia, with only a few weeks to live.  He was being treated by Professor Sir Roy Calne in Addenbrooks Hospital who told his mother Debbie that Ben's only hope would be a liver transplant, but transplantation had virtually ceased in the UK due to a Panorama which implied that organs were being taken from patients who were still alive. Professor Calne suggested the only way to encourage organ donation would be to tell Ben's story on TV, Debbie therefore rang That's Life! The film of Ben captured the nation's imagination, a donor (Matthew Fewkes) was found and Ben lived for another year. On his death, Marti Webb  recorded his favourite song, "Ben" to raise money for a charity founded in his name, and Shaun Woodward and Esther Rantzen wrote a book Story of Ben Hardwick by Shaun Woodward and Esther Rantzen which also raised money for the Ben Hardwick Fund which still exists. The impact of Ben's story doubled the number of transplants and one recipient of a liver transplant, Andrew Hardwick (no relation) appeared in the final programme, "That's Life All Over!"

The Scandal of Crookham Court 
A letter to Esther Rantzen which was forwarded to her by Childline came from a boy at the boarding school, Crookham Court School in Newbury, who had been sexually abused by the owner of the school and had discovered that his brother was also sexually abused by another teacher. A three-month investigation led by researcher Richard Woolfe uncovered widespread abuse of the boys in the school; Rantzen, Woolfe and Hereward Harrison (a Childline executive) visiting the school to speak to pupils. Paedophile Philip Cadman was the millionaire owner of the school who was as a result of the programme tried and convicted of abuse, as were teachers Bill Printer and Philip Edmonds. A special programme, The Scandal of Crookham Court reconstructed the court case at which the children gave evidence.  Author Ian Mucklejohn assisted the investigation and has written a book based on his experience teaching at the school and the evidence of pupils who suffered abuse there. (The Tragedy of Crookham Court School (The Karnac Library) by Ian Mucklejohn) 

"Nest of Paedophiles discovered in the wake of That's Life Investigation"

Sir Nicholas Winton the British Schindler 
Sir Nicholas Winton was revealed for the first time on That's Life! as having rescued a generation of Czech children from the Holocaust. Unknown to him, or them, Sir Nicholas was placed in the audience next to three people who had been on the trains he organised and owed their life to him. Piers Morgan described it as the "best moment of television he had ever seen". It has been viewed on Facebook and YouTube more than forty million times.  A biography was written by his daughter, (The Life of Sir Nicholas Winton by Barbara Winton), and feature films and documentaries were made about his achievements. Other members of his team included Trevor Chadwick, whose statue is in Swanage, and Doreen Warriner, who is honoured with an OBE and a plaque in Prague.

Bullying 
An anti-bullying campaign was inspired by the suicide of teenager Katharine Bamber, after a phone call to the programme from her mother Susan. It resulted in schools adopting anti-bullying policies.

Music on That's Life! 
Although the Braden's Week comedy sketches were discontinued, music was still provided each week by a range of artists, including Alex Glasgow, Jake Thackray, Five Penny Piece, Richard Stilgoe  and Victoria Wood. For many years the British drummer and composer Tony Kinsey was musical director and arranged the title song "That's Life!" for the Hanwell Brass Band. Eventually the musical interludes were provided by non-singers; staff of big companies sang "The Lay of the Week" to customers who complained, and unsuspecting members of the public became a choir in "Get Britain Singing" in which the team of reporters went undercover in gloomy locations such as service stations and hospitals in order to startle people with a cheerful blast of music that inspired them to burst into song. 
Charity records introduced on That's Life! were Pie Jesu written by Andrew Lloyd Webber sung by Sarah Brightman and Paul Miles-Kingston; Wet Wet Wet "With a Little Help From My Friends"; Tom Jones and Dave Stewart "All You Need is Love".

In 1992, That's Life talent contest called Search for a Star discovered singer Alison Jordan, and record producer Simon Cowell who offered a contract as the top prize. The singer Jeremy Taylor invented the term Jobsworth in one of his songs, which prompted the creation of a That's Life Jobsworth Award, presented to anyone who insisted on imposing a stupid rule – such as the clamper who clamped the car in a hospital car park belonging to a husband attending the imminent birth of his baby. From there the term entered the Oxford Dictionary.
House of Commons Hansard Debates for 1 May 1996 (pt 10) "There seems to be here an element of what might qualify for Esther Rantzen's "jobsworth" award. I would certainly like to look at it more closely. I will therefore follow up the matters that my Hon. Friend has raised today, and I hope to be able to write to him in due course."

Humorous items on That's Life! 
Rude vegetables sent in by viewers were notably memorable, cropping up in The Times more than 20 years after That's Life! ended.)
Equally popular were the talented pets discovered by the show, which included singing dogs, dogs that played football, and talking dogs like Prince who said "sausages",  a cat who played ping-pong,  dogs who caught soda water from a syphon and many others including a horse that could count and racing bunnies.
Besides the pets there were "talented tots", such as toddlers who could play the piano, snooker and golf.
Talented passers-by were also featured every week in the vox pops at the start of the show, notably Annie Mizen, who was discovered in a street market in her eighties and became a star.
Esther Rantzen was arrested for obstruction when vox popping in the North End Road. The resulting film took pride of place in her edition of This Is Your Life in which the arresting officer P.C. A. Herbert was a surprise guest. 
During its 21-year run That's Life! was broadcast three times on April 1st, and each time created a prank film to fool the viewers. The first directed by Nick Handel appeared to show a dog that could drive.
The second was an animal in London Zoo called a Lirpa Loof.  starring David Bellamy, which persuaded charabanc-loads of visitors to search the zoo for the non-existent animal with purple droppings. 
The third was a face cream made from rhinoceros spit that eradicated wrinkles from the face but transferred them to a backside, thus imperilling marriages. Edwina Currie, ex Health Minister, promised to mention this to the Prime Minister.

"That's Life All Over!" 
In 1994, the show ended with a 90-minute special recalling the most memorable moments and listing some of the changes inspired by the series. "That's Life All Over!" was executive produced by Richard Woolfe and included a surprise section Rantzen knew nothing about in advance, hosted by David Frost.

  Review in the Independent of last programme: 
"And finally, after 21 years of good consumer journalism and naughty root vegetables, it was That's Life All Over (BBC1). Male presenters came and went - all bluff coves who could switch from the seaside-postcard snigger to the mortician's mask for child-abuse items - but it was always Esther Rantzen's show. Archive footage reminded us of those heady early days when Esther would sweep to her stool in a burnt-orange A-line or Laura Ashley marquee, her cleavage quivering like eggs in a coddler.
Esther's great achievement was to pull off a most un-British thing - the inculcation of the right to complain in a people who know their place before their name. A magazine Mary Poppins, she would add a spoonful of sugar - or smut - to help the medicine go down, and the result was a faintly queasy mixture of consciousness raising and consciousness debasing. That held true to the last show when organ-transplant kids whose lives had undoubtedly been saved by the Ben Hardwick appeal turned up alongside a man who once ran a class for Trimphone impersonators (breep, breep). He has moved with the times and is now offering tuition in the mobile phone. Cheap cheap, goes the phone, cheap cheap. And looking at the children's faces, you wondered."

Controversies

Conflict with Wendy Henry, editor of the News of the World 
An interview with Doc Cox was published by Wendy Henry, edited to appear hostile to Rantzen.  When Cox appeared on that Sunday's programme and denied the quotes, Henry rang and offered to send the transcript. The transcript revealed the way the interview had been edited. This was shown on the subsequent programme to much hilarity, so Henry had the original tapes edited to try to make it fit the newspaper version, and made it available on the phone, revealing it had involved 90 edits in 3 minutes. Henry subsequently left journalism and became PR for Battersea Dogs & Cats Home.

Libel actions
Doctor Gee and Barry Island both sued the programme and won substantial damages from their libel actions against That's Life! and the BBC.

Critics 
The programme aroused strong feelings both in favour and against, from "wonderfully weird and funny" to "ghastly and depressing" 

That's Life! (1973–1994)

Transmissions

Original series

Spin-offs

Special programmes were created on serious issues discussed on That's Life!, such as stillbirth, ("The Lost Babies"), mental health ("Trouble in Mind"), fire safety, and volunteers in their own time refurbishing the St Petersburg Children's Hospital
Talented Pets compilations
A Christmas Special
Junior That's Life! a series for children, introducing Shaun Ley
That's Family Life! – an interview programme featuring family dilemmas
2013 The One Show created a "That's Life Special" celebrating 40 years from the launch, and also launching The Silver Line Helpline for lonely and isolated older people.

Specials

Esther Rantzen's House Trap and Do The Right Thing 
In October 2018, it was announced that a consumer show, Do The Right Thing would air on Channel 5, with Rantzen presenting alongside Eamonn Holmes and Ruth Langsford. Another Channel 5 consumer programme, Esther Rantzen's House Trap was a production more in keeping with the format of the BBC's long-running Watchdog programme, with hidden cameras trying to trap rogue traders in the homes of a number of undercover actors. Unlike Watchdog, these actors were all people of an advanced age with each episode focusing on a different trade, such as locksmiths, where older people were likely to being preyed upon.

Esther Rantzen's House Trap was a four-part series produced by Karen Plumb and Grant Mansfield at Plimsoll Productions for Channel 5, who commissioned the show alongside other consumer-focused shows such as Shop Smart Save Money and Do the Right Thing.

References

External links 
 

BBC Television shows
Consumer protection television series
1970s British television series
1980s British television series
1973 British television series debuts
1994 British television series endings
English-language television shows
Consumer protection in the United Kingdom